Misri Khan Jamali (Balochi:  مِصری خان جمالی)( b. 1921, d. 1982) was a renowned Pakistani artist and Alghoza player from Pakistan.

Early life and career
He was born at village Ronjhan Jamali in Jafarabad District of Balochistan. He belonged to the Jamali Baloch tribe. Later his parents migrated to Nawab Shah Sindh, Pakistan. where he was trained to play Alghoza by Murad Khan Jamali. He had also played on Alghoza at Radio Pakistan, Peshawar.

He performed all over Pakistan and made overseas tours to many countries including United Kingdom , Afghanistan, Singapore and Switzerland. The music of his Alghoza was recorded in different Sindhi classical melodies.

Awards and recognition
 Pride of Performance Award in 1979 by the President of Pakistan.

Death
He died at Nawab Shah, Sindh, Pakistan in 1982,

References

Pakistani artists
Pakistani folk music
Pakistani musicians
Sindhi people
Recipients of the Pride of Performance
1921 births
1982 deaths